Jerzy Popiełuszko ( born Alfons Popiełuszko; 14 September 1947–19 October 1984) was a Polish Roman Catholic priest who became associated with the opposition Solidarity trade union in communist Poland.

He has been recognized as a martyr by the Catholic Church, and was beatified on 6 June 2010 by Archbishop Angelo Amato on behalf of Pope Benedict XVI. A miracle attributed to his intercession and required for his canonization is now under investigation.

Biography

Early life and priesthood

Popiełuszko was born on 14 September 1947 in Okopy near Suchowola. After finishing school, he attended the priests' seminary at Warsaw. In 1966–1968, he served his army duties in a special force in Bartoszyce, aimed at keeping young men from becoming priests. This treatment had no effect on Popiełuszko's beliefs, as, after finishing his army service, he continued his studies, however, the repeated punishments for his resistance affected his health for the rest of his life.

Popiełuszko was ordained a priest by Cardinal Stefan Wyszyński in May 1972. As a young priest he first served in Ząbki near Warsaw in 1972–1975. Afterwards, he served in parishes in Warsaw, which consisted of the common people as well as students. In 1981, Jerzy Popiełuszko joined the workers, taking part with strikers in the Warsaw Steelworks. Thereafter he was associated with workers and trade unionists from the Solidarity movement who opposed the communist regime in Poland.

He was a staunch opponent of the communist regime and, in his sermons, interwove spiritual exhortations with political messages, criticizing the government, expressing solidarity with the interned and motivating people to protest. During the period of martial law the Catholic Church was the only force that could voice protest comparatively openly, with the regular celebration of Mass presenting opportunities for public gatherings in churches.

Popiełuszko's sermons were routinely broadcast by Radio Free Europe, and thus became famous throughout Poland for their uncompromising stance against the regime. The Służba Bezpieczeństwa tried to silence or intimidate him. When those techniques did not work, they fabricated evidence against him; he was arrested in 1983, but soon released on intervention of the clergy and pardoned by an amnesty.

Assassination
Invited by the Pastoral Care of the Working People, Jerzy Popiełuszko arrived in Bydgoszcz on October 19, 1984. At 18.00 he celebrated his last Holy Mass at the Church of the Holy Polish Brothers Martyrs.
A car accident was set up to kill Jerzy Popiełuszko on 13 October 1984 but he evaded it. The alternative plan was to kidnap him; it was carried out on 19 October 1984. The priest was beaten to death by three Security Police officers: Captain Grzegorz Piotrowski, Leszek Pękala, and Waldemar Chmielewski. They pretended to have problems with their car and flagged down Jerzy Popiełuszko's car for help. Popiełuszko was severely beaten, tied up and put in the trunk of the car. The officers bound a stone to his feet and dropped him into the Vistula Water Reservoir near Włocławek from where his body was recovered on 30 October 1984.
 
News of the political murder caused an uproar throughout Poland, and the murderers and one of their superiors, Colonel Adam Pietruszka, were convicted of the crime. More than 250,000 people, including Lech Wałęsa, attended his funeral on 3 November 1984. The murder was widely used in political propaganda of Polish opposition in late 1980s. Popiełuszko's murderers – Captain Grzegorz Piotrowski, Leszek Pękala, Waldemar Chmielewski and Colonel Adam Pietruszka, responsible for giving the order to kill – were sentenced to jail.

Popiełuszko was posthumously awarded the Order of the White Eagle, Poland's highest decoration, in 2009. After death, he was buried in St. Stanislaus Kostka Church, Warsaw, where millions of visitors had paid tribute, including famous politicians like then Vice-President George Bush in September 1987.

Legacy

Media
Noted Polish composer Andrzej Panufnik composed his Bassoon Concerto (1985) in memory of Popiełuszko. The work is inspired by Popiełuszko's work and death.

Christopher Lambert played a character inspired by Popiełuszko in the film To Kill a Priest.

A track entitled "Homily to Popiełuszko" is featured on the B-side to the album Flajelata (1986) by Muslimgauze. The entire B-side of that album is dedicated to all dissidents from the Soviet Union.

A transcript of the trial of Popiełuszko's murderers was used in producing a play, Ronald Harwood's documentary drama The Deliberate Death of a Polish Priest. It was premiered at the Almeida Theatre in October 1985.

A movie,  documenting the life and death of Popiełuszko, was released in Poland in February 2009. Another film, Jerzy Popieluszko: Messenger of the Truth, was produced by Paul G. Hensler in 2013.

In the television show The Americans, the episode "Duty and Honor" in season one featured a fictional Polish resistance leader loosely based on Popiełuszko.

In their work Manufacturing Consent, Edward S. Herman and Noam Chomsky used Popiełuszko's murder and subsequent media coverage in the United States as a case study of their "propaganda model", in which it is compared and contrasted with the coverage of murders of Óscar Romero and other Latin American clergy by US-backed forces.

Monuments

There are numerous monuments to Fr. Popiełuszko in Poland, including the towns of Suchowola, where he attended and graduated high school, Bartoszyce, where he served his army duties, and Ząbki, where he first served as a priest. The places of his kidnapping in Górsk and death in Włocławek are commemorated with monuments in the form of crosses. There is also a museum dedicated to him in Suchowola.

The first monument of Jerzy Popiełuszko was created by Polish sculptor and dissident Marek Sobociński, and was unveiled in 1986 in Mariaholm near Askim, Norway.

A monument to Fr. Popiełuszko in the form of a symbolic gravestone in the shape of a cross was erected by Chicago's Polish community in the garden of memory next to St. Hyacinth Basilica.

A monument to Fr. Popiełuszko in the form of a bust bearing his likeness with a chain wrapped about his neck was erected on the property of Saint Hedwig Catholic Church in Trenton, New Jersey.

A pocket park across from McCarren Park on the Williamsburg-Greenpoint border in Brooklyn, New York, a historically Polish neighborhood, is named for Fr. Popiełuszko and features a stone bust bearing his likeness.

Popieluszko Court in Hartford, Connecticut, was named in his memory. The SS. Cyril & Methodius Church is located on this street, serving as an important cornerstone for the area's Roman Catholic Polish-American community. The street intersects with Charter Oak Boulevard, with the main entrance to the parking lot of the Polish National Home of Hartford across the street at the end of Popieluszko Court.

A two-part monument has been installed in New Britain's Walnut Hill Park consisting of an inscribed stone plaque near an abstract sculpture of an eternal flame.

The stone is inscribed with the Polish Title Zło Dobrem Zwyciężaj: "This human rights monument of common fieldstone
and steel is built in memory of Father Jerzy
Popieluszko who gave his life to God and to the
goals of Solidarność – human rights, justice,
peace and freedom for Poland and for all mankind.
May this eternal flame of liberty and the
memory of his courage and sacrifice burn forever
in the hearts of all freedom-loving people.
1947 Good shall vanquish evil 1984"

The abstract sculpture of the eternal flame was created by Henry Chotkowski and dedicated on June 16, 1989. An aluminum plaque on the stone wall surrounding the sculpture explains the significance of the sculpture.

The rock that was used to kill Popiełuszko was placed in the San Bartolomeo all'Isola in Rome as a relic of a 20th-century martyr, part of the memorial to 20th– and 21st–century martyrs.

There are two monuments commemorating Father Popiełuszko in Budapest, Hungary. In 2017, a monument containing Father Popiełuszko's motto "Overcome evil with good" written in Polish and in Hungarian was unveiled in the Csepel district of the Hungarian capital. In Csepel, there is also a street named after Father Popiełuszko and a belfry in his honor. Meanwhile, in 2016 in the Óbuda-Békásmegyer district of Budapest there is a square named after Father Popiełuszko and a monument consisting of stones that make up a rosary featuring quotes by Popiełuszko.

There is also one monument in the French city of Béziers.

Beatification and canonization
The Roman Catholic Church started the process of his beatification with the declaration of nihil obstat (nothing against) on 15 March 1996 and held a diocesan process from 8 February 1997 to 8 February 2001. This conferred upon him the title of Servant of God. In 2008 the Positio was submitted to the Congregation for the Causes of Saints and on 19 December 2009 it was announced that Pope Benedict XVI had approved the decree for the beatification of Father Popiełuszko.

He was beatified by Archbishop Angelo Amato on 6 June 2010 in Warsaw's Piłsudski Square. His mother, Marianna Popiełuszko, was present at the event. More than 100,000 people attended the open-air Mass in the Polish capital Warsaw to beatify Father Jerzy Popieluszko. Poland Post issued a set of stamps on that same day to mark the beatification.

In October 2013, Cardinal Kazimierz Nycz – the Archbishop of Warsaw, the diocese where Popiełuszko was killed – announced that a miracle attributed to the intercession of the Polish priest has been identified and confirmed in France. Thus Cardinal Nycz predicts that Popiełuszko will likely be canonized soon, based on the credibility of the case presented. A miracle was investigated in a diocesan process in France from 20 September 2014 until 14 September 2015 and the results of that investigation turned over to the Vatican for assessment.

See also

 To Kill a Priest (1988 Fr.), a movie directed by Agnieszka Holland and starring Christopher Lambert as a character based on Jerzy Popiełuszko

References

Further reading

 To Kill A Priest: The Murder of Father Popieluszko and the Fall of Communism by Kevin Ruane (London: Gibson Books, 2004),  / 1-903933-54-4.
The Way of My Cross: Masses at Warsaw by Jerzy Popieluszko (Learning Innovations (1986))  / 089526806X

External links

 Bibliography
 Museum and Other Pages at popieluszko.net.pl
 Popiełuszko. Wolność jest w nas (AKA: Popiełuszko. Freedom is inside us), film, 2009
 Jerzy Popiełuszko: Messenger of the Truth, film, 2013

People from Sokółka County
20th-century Polish Roman Catholic priests
Polish anti-communists
Polish dissidents
Solidarity (Polish trade union) activists
Assassinated Polish people
Assassinated activists
Deaths by beating in Europe
Nonviolence advocates
Polish beatified people
Beatifications by Pope Benedict XVI
Roman Catholic activists
People murdered in Poland
20th-century Roman Catholic martyrs
20th-century venerated Christians
1947 births
1984 deaths
Recipients of the Order of the White Eagle (Poland)